The Bowery Bishop is a 1924 American silent drama film directed by Colin Campbell and starring Henry B. Walthall, Leota Lorraine, and Edith Roberts.

Plot 
Tim Brady accuses Norman Strong, of seducing Venitia Rigola, the girl he loves.

Cast

References

Bibliography
 Donald W. McCaffrey & Christopher P. Jacobs. Guide to the Silent Years of American Cinema. Greenwood Publishing, 1999.

External links
 

1924 films
1924 drama films
1920s English-language films
American silent feature films
Silent American drama films
American black-and-white films
Films directed by Colin Campbell
Selznick Pictures films
1920s American films